Anglo-Jordanian relations refers to the relationship between the Hashemite Kingdom of Jordan and the United Kingdom of Great Britain and Northern Ireland. Both countries share a relatively close relationship because of the Hashemites, who received British help to overthrow Ottoman rule in the country during World War I.

History
During World War I, the Hashemites requested help and support from the British Empire via its administration in Cairo to fight against the Ottomans. The sudden revolt led by the Hashemite family, while not be able to secure total support from other Arab tribes, played an instrumental role on the collapse of Ottoman rule in Jordan. However, the main goal of Hashemite-led revolt - a unitary and independent Arab state - was not honored by London and its French ally. Eventually Britain placed Sharif Abdullah as ruler of the Emirate of Transjordan, hoping to reduce tensions.

Until 1956, the Emirate, while governed by the Hashemites, was not fully independent of British influence. John Bagot Glubb, known as Glubb Pasha, was the de facto ruler of the country; he laid the foundation of the Arab Legion, which would eventually become the Jordanian Armed Forces. Meanwhile, Glubb Pasha played a controversial role, which is still debated in the history of modern Jordanian Kingdom. Transjordan was an integral part of Britain's informal empire. This system of indirect rule continued even after Jordan's independence in 1946.

During the Arab–Israeli War of 1948, Britain secretly favored a total Jordanian invasion of West Bank hoping to wipe out the possible creation of a Palestinian state led by Amin al-Husseini. The invasion was a success which and secured British influence within Transjordan. Britain continued to support Jordan during the Jordanian Civil War against the PLO. Britain also secretly supported Israeli jets to fly in Jordan when Syria sent troops to invade the country, forcing the Syrians to retreat.

James Callaghan and King Hussein formed a close working relationship in the late 1970s, however, the relationship between the United Kingdom and Jordan became even closer and warmer during the premiership of Margaret Thatcher.  Contributing to this was the fact that in the context of the Cold War, Jordan took a decisively pro-western stance.  Margaret Thatcher, who was a hardline anti-communist saw this as an opening for a closer relationship with Jordan.
At the same time, Jordan was looking for strong partners to bolster their own position in the region. These factors combined in such a way that the administration of Margaret Thatcher and the Jordanian government under 
King Hussein of Jordan began coordinating with one another and cooperating with one another on a wide variety of issues.  In late 1990 and early 1991, King Hussein of Jordan worked closely with Prime Minister John Major over the issue of what to do with Saddam Hussein's Iraq during Iraq's occupation of Kuwait.  In the late 1990s and early 2000s, King Abdullah worked closely with British Prime Minister Tony Blair.  Blair visited Jordan in late 2001 and King Abdullah visited Blair in London that same year.  The two countries greatly enhanced their already close defense cooperation during those years.  In 2002, Prime Minister Tony Blair and King Abdullah worked together to help Jordan restructure their debt. After Brexit, ties between Jordan and the United Kingdom grew even closer under the leadership of Prime Minister Theresa May.  Prime Minister Theresa May and the government of Jordan worked out a trade deal between the UK and Jordan which allowed the two countries to work together much more closely than they would have been allowed to had the United Kingdom stayed in the European Union.  The trade deal went into effect on May 1 of 2021. In August of 2019 King Abdullah visited Prime Minister Johnson in London to discuss economic matters. Prime Minister Johnson expressed the UK's commitment to working with Jordan on issues as far ranging as the economy, COVID-19 and combatting terrorism.
Jordan is closer to the United Kingdom than any other Arab nation, and seeks to remain so in the post-Brexit world.

King Hussein himself married Antoinette Gardiner, a British woman who later gave birth to Abdullah II of Jordan. As a result, Abdullah II has British descent through his mother.

Modern ties
Because of this strong kinship and the later marriage between Hussein and Muna, Jordan and the United Kingdom maintain a strong relationship. British PM Theresa May considered Jordan a noteworthy ally; this was reciprocated with the same mutual trust from the Jordanian PM. Two countries also set to expand their bilateral ties.

Both countries have been involved in peace talks between Israel and Palestine.

According from King Abdullah II, the relationship has become true partnership.

In November 2019, Jordan and the United Kingdom renewed an existing security cooperation for another three-year term for the Public Security Directorate and the General Directorate of Gendarmerie. The cooperation program aims to support Jordan's counterterrorism, public order management and the executive sector.

Jordan Embassy 
Jordan has an embassy in London.

 Ambassador Omar Bakart Mnawer Al Nahar

United Kingdom Embassy 
The United Kingdom has an embassy in Amman.

 Ambassador Bridget Brind

See also
Treaty of London (1946)

References

Further reading
 Alon, Yoav. "‘Heart-Beguiling Araby’ on the Frontier of Empire: Early Anglo-Arab Relations in Transjordan." British Journal of Middle Eastern Studies 36.1 (2009): 55-72.
 Ashton, Nigel J. "‘A “Special Relationship” sometimes in spite of ourselves’: Britain and Jordan, 1957–73." Journal of Imperial and Commonwealth History 33.2 (2005): 221-244.
 Oren, Michael B. "A Winter of Discontent: Britain's Crisis in Jordan, December 1955-March 1956." International Journal of Middle East Studies 22.2 (1990): 171–184.
 Ovendale, Ritchie. "Great Britain and the Anglo-American invasion of Jordan and Lebanon in 1958." International History Review 16.2 (1994): 284–303.
 Tal, Lawrence. "Britain and the Jordan Crisis of 1958." Middle Eastern Studies 31.1 (1995): 39–57.
 Wilson, Mary Christina. King Abdullah, Britain and the making of Jordan (Cambridge University Press, 1990).

External links
Jordanian embassy in the United Kingdom
British Embassy Amman

 
United Kingdom
Jordan
Relations of colonizer and former colony